Francis McGinn (2 March 1919 – December 1995) was a Scottish footballer who played as a winger. He played in the English football league for Wrexham and Ipswich Town.

References

1919 births
1995 deaths
Sportspeople from Cambuslang
Forth Wanderers F.C. players
Wrexham A.F.C. players
Ipswich Town F.C. players
Cowdenbeath F.C. players
Scottish footballers
Association football wingers
Footballers from South Lanarkshire